Blythburgh railway station was located in Blythburgh, Suffolk. The station had two goods sheds. The one shown below is the only remaining building of the Southwold Railway. It closed in 1929, 50 years after it had opened for passenger traffic.

References

External links
Blythburgh station site in 1963
 History of Blythburgh

Disused railway stations in Suffolk
Former Southwold Railway stations
Railway stations in Great Britain opened in 1879
Railway stations in Great Britain closed in 1929